The Orlan-10 is a reconnaissance, unmanned aerial vehicle (UAV) developed by the Special Technology Center (STC) in Saint Petersburg for the Russian Armed Forces. The Orlan-10 features a composite hull that reduces its radar signature.

One system can include up to five vehicles. The price for one system (including 2 drones, a portable launch complex, a control station and a set of spare parts) is reportedly 5 million rubles, or ~US$160,000 (FY 2013). 

Over 50 UAVs were delivered for export in 2021 to Russia's allies. It has seen action in Ukraine, Syria, Libya and Nagorno-Karabakh. According to media reports, an updated variant of Orlan-10 tactical UAV was to enter service with the Russia's ground forces in 2020. The updated variant is expected to have a laser designator to allow it to pinpoint targets for precision-guided artillery and aircraft munitions.

More than 1,000 Orlan-10s have been produced (2018), with 11 different variations. More Orlan-10s and 30s were ordered in August 2022.

Operational history

Ukraine

War in Donbass 
The Orlan-10 is reportedly being used in the Russo-Ukrainian War.  In this conflict aerial reconnaissance by unmanned aerial vehicles is banned by the Minsk agreements. Ukrainian officials have claimed to have had shot down or captured several UAVs of this type since 2014:
 In May 2014, Ukrainian officials reported that they had shot down an Orlan-10 in Ukraine.
 In July 2014, Ukrainian forces shot down two UAVs of this type – No. 10212 near Zelenopillia and No. 10237 near Amvrosiivka.
 In August 2014, another Orlan-10 (No. 10215) was shot down by the Ukrainian forces with Strela-10 SAM system.
 In April 2016, the Security Service of Ukraine (SBU) published a video of the UAV (No. 10264) which it claimed to have shot down near Avdiivka.
 In November 2016, Ukrainian officials stated that they had retrieved an Orlan-10 (No. 10332) drifting on the Azov Sea near Mariupol.
 In September 2017, an Orlan-10 (No. 11057) fell down on Ukrainian territory and was captured by Ukrainian forces.
 On 28 December 2017, Ukrainian troops shot down another Orlan-10 near Toretsk.
 On 10 January 2018, Ukrainian troops shot down another Orlan-10.
 On 13 October 2018, an Orlan-10 was shot down by a Ukrainian Mi-24 helicopter using gunfire near Lysychansk.
 On 19 November 2018, an Orlan-10 UAV was shot down by Ukrainian air defense forces. RB-341V Leer-3 electronic warfare systems, which can control up to three Orlan-10 drones, were also spotted in Ukraine by OSCE in 2018 and 2020.

2022 Invasion of Ukraine

An upgraded strike version of the Orlan-10 able to carry four high-explosive fragmentation projectiles was reportedly used in the 2022 Russian invasion of Ukraine. According to the Ukrainian Military, at least 85 have been shot down in combat during the war, including by a UK-supplied Martlet missile. A version called Moskit is used for EW.

By December 2022, Orlan-10 use had become rare over Ukraine. While in the early months of the war the Russians would have two flying at once, one for reconnaissance and one to correct artillery strikes, in the summer only one would be used, and by the end of the year it was likely Russia was running out of the type. Colonel Yurii Solovey, head of air defense for the Ukrainian ground forces, said his unit has destroyed more than 580 Orlan-10s since the invasion began. The lack of drones affected Russian forces' ability to recon for artillery and counterbattery fire. Alternative drones were employed to fill the Orlan-10's role, but they are difficult to procure due to dependence on components originating from countries that have imposed sanctions.

On 3 January 2023, CBS News reported that Russian Orlan-10 UAVs shot down over Ukraine in the past 4 months contained U.S. and Swiss made microchips (Maxim, Microchip and U-Blok) used for their ability to connect to the GLONASS positioning system for navigation. These chips are also able to access the GPS and Galileo systems contributing to redundancy  and increase accuracy for flying and targeting.

Syria 
The Orlan-10 is being actively used by the Russian Ground Forces in the Syrian Civil War for either reconnaissance, collecting aerial imagery or 3D-mapping in support of humanitarian convoys and S&R operations.

In November 2015, an Orlan-10 located the surviving member of a downed Russian Su-24M2 bomber and facilitated his speedy recovery.

On 10 March 2020, an Orlan-10 drone was shot down by Syrian rebels in Suluk, Raqqa Governorate.

On 9 June 2021, an Orlan-10 killed a prominent HTS member known as Abu Khalid al-Shami.

Belarus 
In early February 2022, an Orlan-10 drone crashed near Brest.

Romania 
On 13 March 2022, an Orlan-10 was found on a field in Bistrița-Năsăud County, Romania. It was initially thought to be a drone owned by a private person in Romania, however it was soon identified as a Russian-made Orlan-10. The investigation is ongoing. According to the Ukrainian Air Force, the drone belongs to the Russian army.

Mali 
On 16 July 2022, Islamic State in the Greater Sahara shot down an Orlan-10 in Ménaka Region operated by Wagner Group.

Specifications 

The Orlan-10, while not sophisticated, is cheap and simple to operate. It flies too high to be vulnerable to short-range air defences, but is too inexpensive to justify using costly long-range defences. It provides a sufficient view of the battlefield to identify targets.

Gallery

See also
Boeing Insitu ScanEagle

References

Unmanned military aircraft of Russia